Cummings v. Premier Rehab Keller, P.L.L.C., 596 U.S. ___ (2022), was a United States Supreme Court case related to the Rehabilitation Act of 1973 and the Affordable Care Act.

Background 

Jane Cummings is deaf and legally blind. American Sign Language is her primary method of communication. In 2018, she sued Premier Rehab Keller, a company that offers physical therapy, under the Rehabilitation Act of 1973 and the Affordable Care Act for not providing her an ASL interpreter. She sought damages for emotional distress. The United States District Court for the Northern District of Texas dismissed her complaint, holding neither law allows people to recover damages for emotional distress. The United States Court of Appeals for the Fifth Circuit affirmed. Cummings filed a petition for a writ of certiorari.

Supreme Court 

Certiorari was granted in the case on July 2, 2021. Oral arguments were held on November 30, 2021. On April 28, 2022, the Supreme Court affirmed the Fifth Circuit in a 6–3 decision, with Chief Justice John Roberts writing the majority, and Justice Stephen Breyer writing the dissent. Because the structure of Title VI of the Civil Rights Act of 1964 is similar to the Rehabilitation Act and the ACA, this decision means people cannot recover emotional distress damages under that statute, either.

References

External links 
 

2022 in United States case law
United States Supreme Court cases
United States Supreme Court cases of the Roberts Court
United States disability case law